Loaded is a British Dramedy produced by Hillbilly Television and Keshet UK for Channel 4. It is based on the Israeli series Mesudarim. The show premiered on 8 May 2017 and stars Jim Howick, Samuel Anderson, Jonny Sweet and Nick Helm as a group of four university students who become multi-millionaires. Eight episodes aired in series 1. The series was picked up in the United States by AMC, and premiered on 17 July 2017. Loaded was cancelled after one series by Channel 4.

Cast
 Jim Howick as Josh
 Samuel Anderson as Leon
 Jonny Sweet as Ewan
 Nick Helm as Watto
 Mary McCormack as Casey
 Aimee-Ffion Edwards as Abi
 Lolly Adefope as Naomi
 Scarlett Alice Johnson as Paula

Episodes

Series 1 (2017)

References

External links
 
 
 

2017 British television series debuts
2017 British television series endings
2010s British comedy-drama television series
2010s British television miniseries
2010s British LGBT-related comedy television series
2010s British LGBT-related drama television series
Channel 4 comedy dramas
AMC (TV channel) original programming
English-language television shows
Television shows set in London
Television shows about video games